Hani Mitwasi (Arabic: هاني متواسي, born 1983 in Kuwait City) is a Jordanian singer-musician who is famous for singing in the ‘Spanish-Levant' music genre. After several years of following his passion of the Spanish and Flamenco music, He got his BA in music science at the 'Jordan Academy of Music in 2005, in addition to his 5 years of studying the flamenco guitar.

Musical career 
Mitwasi released his first album "Khamrat Al Hob" (Translation: "the Liquor of Love") in 2006 which comprised the remaking of six folklore Levant songs in the new ‘Spanish-Levant' line of music. Mitwasi went on to release his second album "Barmi El Salam" (Translation: "Spreading my Salutation") in 2007 where it consisted the remake of five folklore Levant songs in the new "Spanish-Levant' line of music in addition to one of his singles "Barmi El Salam".

Following the success of the second album, 'Platinum Records' contracted Mitwasi where they jointly produced a new album called "Ozran Habibi" (Translation: "Apologies my love") which was one of the factors that led Mitwasi to win the 'Jordan Music Award' for best Jordanian artist in 2010. This album was not based on the Spanish-Levant style, rather it consisted of 9 originals that were based on the modern style of Levant music.

Mitwasi is known for his live performances; in 2012; he reproduced and sang live "Mawtini" (Translation: "My homeland"), one of the most famous national songs in Arab history, where it inspired several regional artists to record it in a similar performance. In 2013, Mitwasi performed live along with Alberto Lopez and his band in a Flamenco Levant concert which resulted in an audience exceeding 5,000 people. The concert was recorded and released in an album called "Live Concert".

Mitwasi was appointed as one of the judges in the talent show of "Jordan star" in 2015 and 2017.

Discography 
 Khamrat Al Hob   2006                                      
 Khamrat Al Hob                                              
 Talaa men Bait Abooha
 Ya Lour
 Fog El Nakhal - Hali Hal
 Ya Msaleeny
 Ghazale 
 Barmi El Ealam    2007
 Sebooni ya Nas
 Telet ya Mahla Norha
 Ya Reem
 Awal Eshret Mahbooby
 Ya Tair ya Tayer
 Barmi El Salam
 Ozraa Habibi    2010
 Wenak Habibi
 Sebooni ya Nas
 Lawn El Bahr
 Enhebek 
 Ahwaly Matsoresh
 Jay Ala Bali
 Men Be'ed
 Albi Ablak Tah
 Ozraa Habibi
 Live Concert    2014
 Hali Hal
 Khamrat Al Hob
 Sahar El Layali
 Lela Ya Samra 
 Seboni Ya Nas 
 Ya Lour
 Ya Reem
 Ya Mohra
 Dalona 
 Slema
 Sabri Alek Tal 
 Awel Marra
 Ensa Gharamak
 Singles
 wala Ala Baly
 Ya Mohra 
 Mawtini
 Haqiq Helem ( World Cup )
 Ouli El kelme
 Majnoon Bhobbak
 Esmy Elazzabi
 Al Rajol Al Aly

External links 
 Hani Mitwasi Official Website
 Hani Mitwasi on Facebook
 Hani Mitwasi's channel on YouTube
 Instagram: https://www.instagram.com/hanimitwasi/

References 

1983 births
Living people
People from Kuwait City
Jordanian male singers